Perwang am Grabensee is a municipality in the district of Braunau am Inn in the Austrian state of Upper Austria.

Geography
Perwang lies on the Grabensee in the Innviertel. About 20 percent of the municipality is forest and 70 percent farmland.

References

Cities and towns in Braunau am Inn District